Veerey Ki Wedding is an Indian Hindi-language romantic comedy film that was released on 2 March 2018. It was directed by Ashu Trikha, and stars Pulkit Samrat, Kriti Kharbanda and Jimmy Sheirgill.

Cast 
 Pulkit Samrat as Veer Arora (Veerey)
 Kriti Kharbanda as Geet Bhalla
 Jimmy Sheirgill as Balli Arora
 Satish Kaushik as Gopi Bhalla
 Yuvika Chaudhary as Inspector Rani Chaudhary
 Payal Rajput as Rinki Vohra
 Supriya Karnik as Juhi Bhalla
 Priyanka Nayan as Riya
 Vidyadhar Karmakar as Bade Babu ji
 Sapna Choudhary in item number "Hatt Ja Tau Pache Ne"

Soundtrack 

The music of the film is composed by Meet Bros, Farzan Faaiz, Jaidev Kumar and Ashok Punjabi while lyrics are penned by Kumaar, Faaiz Anwar, Chandan Bakshi, Deepak Noor, Dr. Devendra Kafir, Ramkesh Jiwanpurwala and Ashok Punjabi. The background music of the film is composed by Sanjoy Chowdhury. The songs featured in the film are sung by Mika Singh, Sunidhi Chauhan, Navraj Hans, Saloni Thakkar, Meet Bros, Neha Kakkar, Deep Money, Javed Ali and Akanksha Bhandari. The first track of the film Mind Blowing which is sung by Mika Singh was released on 9 February 2018. The second song of the film to be released was Hatt Ja Tau which is sung by Sunidhi Chauhan was released on 15 February 2018. The third song of the film, Veerey Ki Wedding (Title Track) which is sung by Navraj Hans and Saloni Thakkar was released on 21 February 2018. The fourth track, Talli Tonight which is sung by Meet Bros, Neha Kakkar and Deep Money was released on 27 February 2018. The soundtrack was released on 27 February 2018 by T-Series.

Controversies 

On 19 February 2018, Haryanvi singer Vikas Kumar sent a legal notice to the makers over copyright issues for the song "Hatt Ja Tau". Vikas has claimed that he has originally sung the number and the makers did not seek prior permission before using it in the film. Kumar's lawyer has stated that the makers cannot use the song without his permission and will have to pay him Rs 7 crore.

Veerey Ki Wedding is also in the news for its clash with Sonam Kapoor-Kareena Kapoor Khan starrer Veere Di Wedding'''s title. Mumbai High Court ruled in the favour of the makers of Veerey Ki Wedding''.

References

External links 
 
 

2010s Hindi-language films
2018 films
2018 romantic comedy films
Films about Indian weddings
Films directed by Ashu Trikha
Indian romantic comedy films